The Usambara torrent frog (Arthroleptides martiensseni), also known as Martienssen's torrent frog, or Tanzania rocky river frog, is a species of frog in the family Petropedetidae endemic to the Usambara Mountains of Tanzania. It is one of many, often taxonomically unrelated, frogs referred to as torrent frogs.

These frogs are associated with rocky streams in montane forests. Eggs are laid on rocks close to torrential streams and waterfalls. The tadpoles remain attached to the rocks, where they develop, not entering the water. It is threatened by habitat loss.

References

Arthroleptides
Endemic fauna of Tanzania
Amphibians of Tanzania
Taxonomy articles created by Polbot
Amphibians described in 1911